"All I Ever Wanted" is the "winner's single" of the fifth season of Canadian Idol.

Background
It was recorded by Idol winner Brian Melo. It was also recorded by runner up Jaydee Bixby; though his version was not officially released it was leaked onto the internet.
Brian's version of the single has debuted at #11 on the Canadian Hot 100, as of September 29, 2007.

Production
The song was written by Chris Perry and Nicole Hughes. It was recorded September 2007, two months before the album's release.

Charts

References

Canadian pop songs
2007 songs